Nishada marginalis is a moth of the family Erebidae first described by Felder in 1875. It is found on Sulawesi in Indonesia.

References

Lithosiina
Moths described in 1875